This is the list of cathedrals in Haiti sorted by denomination.

Roman Catholic 
Cathedrals of the Roman Catholic Church in Haiti:

 Cathedral of St. Anne in Anse-à-Veau
 Cathedral of Our Lady of the Assumption in Cap-Haïtien
 Cathedral of St. Joseph in Fort-Liberté
 Cathedral of the Immaculate Conception in Hinche
 Cathedral of St. James and St. Philip in Jacmel
 Cathedral of St. Louis King of France in Jérémie
 Cathedral of Our Lady of the Assumption in Les Cayes
 Cathedral of St. Charles Borromeo in Gonaïves
 Cathedral of Our Lady of the Assumption in Port-au-Prince; destroyed in the 2010 earthquake
 Cathedral of the Immaculate Conception in Port-de-Paix
 Co-Cathedral of St. John the Baptist in Miragoâne

Anglican
Anglican Cathedrals in Haiti:
 Holy Trinity Cathedral in Port-au-Prince

See also
Lists of cathedrals
Christianity in Haiti

References

Haiti
Cathedrals
Haiti
Cathedrals